TASH is an international advocacy association of people with disabilities, their family members, other advocates, and people who work in the disability field. The mission of TASH is to promote the full inclusion and participation of children and adults with significant disabilities in every aspect of their community, and to eliminate the social injustices that diminish human rights. TASH operates as a 501(c)(3) non-profit organization. It has over 30 chapters, a committee structure (e.g., community living, and housing subcommittee) and members in 34 countries and territories and is headquartered at 2013 H Street NW, Suite 715, Washington, D.C. 20006.

History

TASH was founded in 1975 under the name "American Association for the Education of the Severely / Profoundly Handicapped" ("AAESPH"). The name was changed to "The Association for the Severely Handicapped" (TASH) in 1980, and again to the name The Association for Persons with Severe Handicaps in 1983. In 1995, the Board of Directors decided to drop that name as well, since it did not fit with current values. The name TASH is still used due to its high name recognition.

Activities

TASH publishes a quarterly scholarly journal, Research and Practice for Persons with Severe Disabilities, and a popular magazine, Connections.

See also

Autism rights movement
Self-advocacy

Bibliography

External links
Official TASH website
 About page on official TASH website
Research and Practice for Persons with Severe Disabilities at the SAGE website
A brief History of TASH by one of its founders, Wayne Sailor

Disability organizations based in the United States
501(c)(3) organizations
Non-profit organizations based in Washington, D.C.